Sidney Ellis was  a rugby union international who represented England in 1880.

Early life
Sidney Ellis was born on 13 March 1859 in Lewisham. He attended Dulwich College.

Rugby union career
Ellis made his international debut on 2 February 1880 at Lansdowne Road in the Ireland vs England match which was won by England. This was the only test he played in.

References

1859 births
1937 deaths
England international rugby union players
English rugby union players
People educated at Dulwich College
Rugby union forwards
Rugby union players from Lewisham